USC men's basketball may refer to:

 South Carolina Gamecocks men's basketball, the collegiate men's basketball program of the University of South Carolina (often referred to as "SC" or "USC" in athletics)
 USC Trojans men's basketball, the collegiate men's basketball program of the University of Southern California